RsmW is a part of the Rsm/Csr family of non-coding RNAs (ncRNAs) discovered in Pseudomonas aeruginosa. It  specifically binds to RsmA protein in vitro, restores biofilm production (possibly due to the interaction with RsmA) and partially complements the loss of RsmY and RsmZ in rsmY/rsmZ double mutant in regards to their contribution to swarming. Compared to RsmY and RsmZ its production is induced in high temperatures and rsmW is not transcriptionally activated by GacA.

See also 
 CsrB/RsmB RNA family
 CsrC RNA family
 PrrB/RsmZ RNA family
 RsmY RNA family
 RsmX
 CsrA protein

References 

Non-coding RNA